The 1902 California Golden Bears football team was an American football team that represented the University of California, Berkeley during the 1902 college football season. The team competed as an independent under head coach James Whipple and compiled a record of 8–0.

Schedule

References

California
California Golden Bears football seasons
College football undefeated seasons
California Golden Bears football